(born December 7, 1927) is a Japanese entrepreneur. Formerly a civil servant, he is the founder and (until 2020) president of Sanrio, a merchandise company known for its characters, including Hello Kitty.

Biography

Early life
Shintaro Tsuji was born in Kofu, Yamanashi Prefecture, to a manageress of three ryokan. He was a student of a kindergarten affiliated with the Toyo Eiwa Jogakuin. As part of a wealthy family belonging to the Saegusa clan, Tsuji, as their first child, lived a life of luxury, yet he was secluded. When his mother died of leukemia, Tsuji was under the care of his abusive aunt. From 1945 to 1947, Tsuji studied chemical engineering at Kiryu Technical College (now a part of Gunma University); at that time, he also practiced manufacturing, and he would later take advantage of the post-World War II shortage situation in the country by creating goods for the black market - an act that formed the basis of his entrepreneurial career.

Government tenure
In 1949, Tsuji started working for the government of Yamanashi Prefecture, at the urging of his relatives. He first worked in a job Tsuji described as his "second adversity after his boyhood", before becoming a teacher, and later (under the request of Hisashi Amano, then-governor of Yamanashi Prefecture), a commerce worker. He would later leave the government in 1960, but not before being almost involved in a slander campaign against Amano's opponents.

As founder of Sanrio
In 2020, Tsuji stepped down as president of Sanrio, and was succeeded by his grandson, Tomokuni.

Personal life
Tsuji married Yasuko in the 1950s. He is the father of Kunihiko Tsuji (who was at one point the heir of Sanrio before his death in 2013) and the grandfather of Tomokuni Tsuji (currently the president of Sanrio, and the youngest CEO of a TOPIX-listed company), who coincidentally has the same birthday as Hello Kitty. Tsuji had an interest in Greek mythology, owing to his time with his aunt.

During his college years, Tsuji contracted tuberculosis, and had to recover in his family home for several months. As president of Sanrio, he also thought of committing suicide at one point, but Tsuji ended up wanting to live upon undergoing polypectomy.

Works

Filmography (selected)

Bibliography
As a book author, he had written more than a dozen books, ranging from fairy tales to business.

References

Footnotes

Citations

Sources

 

1927 births
Japanese businesspeople
People from Yamanashi Prefecture
Anime screenwriters
Living people
Sanrio